Search Engine Results Pages (SERP) are the pages displayed by search engines in response to a query by a user. The main component of the SERP is the listing of results that are returned by the search engine in response to a keyword query. The page that a search engine returns after a user submits a search query. In addition to organic search results, search engine results pages (SERPs) usually include paid search and pay-per-click (PPC) ads.

The results are of two general types :

 organic search: retrieved by the search engine's algorithm
 sponsored search: advertisements.

The results are normally ranked by relevance to the query. Each result displayed on the SERP normally includes a title, a link that points to the actual page on the Web, and a short description showing where the keywords have matched content within the page for organic results. For sponsored results, the advertiser chooses what to display.

Due to the huge number of items that are available or related to the query, there are usually several pages in response to a single search query as the search engine or the user's preferences restrict viewing to a subset of results per page. Each succeeding page will tend to have lower ranking or lower relevancy results. Just like the world of traditional print media and its advertising, this enables competitive pricing for page real estate, but is complicated by the dynamics of consumer expectations and intent— unlike static print media where the content and the advertising on every page is the same all of the time for all viewers, despite such hard copy being localized to some degree, usually geographic, like state, metro-area, city, or neighbourhood, search engine results can vary based on individual factors such as browsing habits.

Components
The organic search results, query, and advertisements are the three main components of the SERP, However, the SERP of major search engines, like Google, Yahoo!, Bing, Petal, Sogou may include many different types of enhanced results (organic search, and sponsored) such as rich snippets, images, maps, definitions, answer boxes, videos or suggested search refinements. A recent study revealed that 97% of queries in Google returned at least one rich feature.

The major search engines visually differentiate specific content types such as images, news, and blogs. Many content types have specialized SERP templates and visual enhancements on the first search results page.

Search query

Also known as 'user search string', this is the word or set of words that are typed by the user in the search bar of the search engine. The search box is located on all major search engines like Google, Yahoo, Bing, Petal, Sogou. Users indicate the topic desired based on the keywords they enter into the search box in the search engine.

In the competition between search engines to draw the attention of more users and advertisers, consumer satisfaction has been a driving force in the evolution of the search algorithm applied to better filter the results by relevancy.

Search queries are no longer successful based upon merely finding words that match purely by spelling. Intent and expectations have to be derived to determine whether the appropriate result is a match based upon the broader meanings drawn from context.

And that sense of context has grown from simple matching of words, and then of phrases, to the matching of ideas. And the meanings of those ideas change over time and context. Successful matching can be crowdsourced, what are others currently searching for and clicking on, when one enters keywords related to those other searches. And crowdsourcing may be focused based upon one's own social networking.

With the advent of portable devices, smartphones, and wearable devices, watches, and various sensors, these provide ever more contextual dimensions for consumers and advertisers to refine and maximize relevancy using such additional factors that may be gleaned like: a person's relative health, wealth, and various other statuses, time of day, personal habits, mobility, location, weather, and nearby services and opportunities, whether urban or suburban, like events, food, recreation, and business. Social context and crowdsourcing influences can also be pertinent factors.

The move away from keyboard input and the search box to voice access, aside from convenience, also makes other factors available to varying degrees of accuracy and pertinence, like a person's character, intonation, mood, accent, ethnicity, and even elements overheard from nearby people and the background environment.

Searching is changing from explicit keywords: on TV show w, did x marry y or z, or election results for candidate x in county y for this date z, or final scores for team x in game y for this date z to vocalizing from a particular time and location: hey, so who won. And getting the results that one expects.

Organic results
Organic SERP listings are the natural listings generated by search engines based on a series of metrics that determine their relevance to the searched term. Webpages that score well on a search engine's algorithmic test shown in this list. These algorithms are generally based upon factors such as quality and relevance of the content, expertise, authoritativeness, and trustworthiness of the website and author on a given topic, good user experience and backlinks.

People tend to view the first results on the first page. Each page of search engine results usually contains 10 organic listings (however some results pages may have fewer organic listings). According to a 2019 study, the click-through rates (CTRs) for the first page goes as follows:
 Position 1: 31.7%
 Position 2: 24.7%
 Position 3: 18.7%
 Position 4: 13.6%
 Position 5: 9.5%
 Position 6: 6.2%
 Position 7: 4.2%
 Position 8: 3.1%
 Position 9: 3%
 Position 10: 3.1%

Sponsored results

Several major search engines offer "sponsored results" to companies, who may pay the search engine to have their products or services appear above other search hits. This is often done in the form of bidding between companies, where the highest bidder gets the top result. A 2018 report from the European Commission showed that consumers generally avoid these top results, as there is an expectation that the topmost results on a search engine page will be sponsored, and thus less relevant.

Rich snippets
Rich snippets are displayed by Google in the search results pages when a website contains content in structured data markup. Structured data markup helps the Google algorithm to index and understand the content better.
Google supports rich snippets for the following data types:

 Product – Information about a product, including price, availability, and review ratings.
 Recipe – Recipes that can be displayed in web searches and Recipe View.
 Review – A review of an item such as a restaurant, movie, or store.
 Event – An organized event, such as musical concerts or art festivals, that people may attend at a particular time and place.
 Software Application – Information about a software app, including its URL, review ratings, and price.
 Video – An online video, including a description and thumbnail, and shows the three resources of answers image, content, and URL in one box.
 News article – A news article, including the headline, images, and publisher info.
 Science datasets
 Job-related content
 Mark up "how-to" pages
 Sitelinks Search Box
 Frequently asked questions (FAQ)
 Movie
 Job training & job posting
 Breadcrumb

Featured snippets 
Featured Snippet is a summary of an answer to a user's query. This snippet appears at the top of the list of search hits. Google supports the following types of featured snippets:

Knowledge graph
Search engines like Google, Bing, Sogou have started to expand their data into Encyclopedia and other rich sources of information.

Google for example calls this sort of information "Google Knowledge Graph", if a search query matches it will display an additional sub-window on right hand side with information from its sources.

Google Discover 
Google discover formerly known as Google feed is a way of getting topics and news information to users on the homepage below the search box.

Generation
Major search engines like Google, Yahoo!, Bing, Petal, Sogou primarily use content contained within the page and fallback to metadata tags of a web page to generate the content that makes up a search snippet. Generally, the HTML title tag will be used as the title of the snippet while the most relevant or useful contents of the web page (description tag or page copy) will be used for the description.

Scraping and automated access
Search engine result pages are protected from automated access by a range of defensive mechanisms and terms of service. These result pages are the primary data source for Search engine optimization, the website placement for competitive keywords that has become an important field of business and interest. Google has even used Twitter to warn users against this practice

The sponsored (creative) results on Google can cost a large amount of money for advertisers. The most expensive keywords are for legal services, especially personal injury lawyers in highly competitive markets. These keywords range in the hundreds of USD, while the most expensive is nearly 1000 USD for each sponsored click.

The process of harvesting search engine result pages data is usually called "search engine scraping" or in a general form "web crawling" and generates the data SEO-related companies need to evaluate website competitive organic and sponsored rankings. This data can be used to track the position of websites and show the effectiveness of SEO as well as keywords that may need more SEO investment to rank higher.

UX and SERP 
There are more than 200 different factors defining ranking in SERP. User experience is one of the most important indicators for the Search Engines. They strive to display the most relevant results for their users and constantly check the user behavior regarding websites that are in SERP.

Search Engines can change the position of a website if its CTR is very low compared with the competitors.

See also
 User intent

References

Search engine optimization
Internet search engines
Internet terminology